Hooker Lake is a proglacial lake that started to form in the late 1970s by the recent retreat of the Hooker Glacier.  It is in the Hooker Valley, in the Aoraki / Mount Cook National Park in New Zealand's South Island, just south of Aoraki / Mount Cook.

Etymology
The geographic Hooker items were named by the Canterbury provincial geologist, Julius von Haast, after British botanist William Jackson Hooker.

Description
It is expected to grow by another  as Hooker Glacier retreats further up the valley until the glacier's retreat will have reached the point where the glacier bed is higher than the lake's water level.

The lake is one of the most accessible glacier lakes and can be reached year-round from the White Horse Hill camp ground near Mount Cook Village via the well-formed Hooker Valley Track.  The track ends at a lookout point at the lake's shore, with a short path providing easy access to the shore.

In the warmer months icebergs can typically be seen floating in the water. The icebergs slowly drift from the terminus of the glacier at the northern end of the lake until close to the shore.

In winter, the lake freezes over, and at the coldest time of the year it can be safe to walk onto the ice.

Hooker Lake drains into Hooker River, its glacial waters blueish light grey due to the suspended glacial rock flour.

No boats tour the lake, but they do the large, nearby Tasman Lake.

See also
Climate change in New Zealand

References

Lakes of Canterbury, New Zealand
Proglacial lakes
Aoraki / Mount Cook National Park